{{DISPLAYTITLE:C14H19N}}
The molecular formula C14H19N (molar mass: 201.31 g/mol, exact mass: 201.1517 u) may refer to:

 Camfetamine (N-methyl-3-phenyl-norbornan-2-amine)
 EXP-561
 PD-137889 (N-methylhexahydrofluorenamine)

Molecular formulas